Calf-intestinal alkaline phosphatase (CIAP/CIP) is a type of alkaline phosphatase that catalyzes the removal of  phosphate groups from the 5' end of DNA strands and phosphomonoesters from RNA. This enzyme is frequently used in DNA sub-cloning, as DNA fragments that lack the 5' phosphate groups cannot ligate. This prevents recircularization of the linearized DNA vector and improves the yield of the vector containing the appropriate insert.

References

Enzymes
Genetics techniques